Jezreel Corrales González (born July 12, 1991) is a Panamanian professional boxer who held the WBA (Super) super featherweight title from 2016 to 2017.

Professional career 
Corrales made his professional debut on 2009, at the age of 17. Corrales lost his second fight by unanimous decision, being knocked down twice over four rounds. He is managed by Lesbia de Moss and trained by Juan Mosquera.

Corrales vs. Giono 
In April 2012, Corrales defeated Rolando Giono by a narrow split decision (75-74, 75–74, 73-77), to become the Panamanian national featherweight champion. On 2013, one of Corrales' wins was overturned to a no contest by the Panama Boxing Commission after he tested positive for cannabis. On 2014, Corrales won the FECARBOX featherweight title, before moving up to super featherweight.

Corrales vs. Rodriguez 
In December 2015, Corrales defeated Juan Antonio Rodríguez for the WBA interim super featherweight title. Corrales dominated Rodríguez from beginning to end, Rodríguez retired in his stool before round 12.

WBA super featherweight champion

Corrales vs. Uchiyama 
In March 2016, it was announced that Corrales would be facing WBA (Super) champion Takashi Uchiyama on April. The fight would take place at the Ota-City Gymnasium, marking the first time Corrales fought outside Panama. In a big upset, Corrales won the world title with a second-round knockout victory Uchiyama. Uchiyama was looking to defend his world title for the twelfth time against Corrales. Corrales overwhelmed Uchiyama, knocking him down three times in round 2 before the referee waved off the fight.

Corrales vs. Uchiyama II 
A rematch between Corrales and Uchiyama was agreed to for December 2016, at the same venue. Uchiyama scored a flash knockdown in round 5 but was unable to reclaim the world title, as Corrales retained with a split decision win (117-110, 115–112, 113-114).

Corrales vs. Castellanos 
Corrales' second defense came against Robinson Castellanos in July 2017 at The Forum. Castellanos and Corrales traded knockdowns, with Corrales down twice in round 4 and Castellanos down in round 7, in a tense and thrilling encounter that ended prematurely as Castellanos was unable to continue due to an accidental headbutt in round 10. The fight went to the scorecards, which saw Corrales win a majority technical decision (96-92, 94–93, 94-94).

Corrales vs. Machado 
Corrales lost his title against Alberto Machado on 21 October 2017 in a fight that headlined a HBO Boxing After Dark show. Machado was ranked #4 by the WBA at super featherweight. Corrales lost his title on the scales, coming in at 133.25 lb, 3.25 above the division's weight limit. Corrales started the fight dominating Machado with sharper boxing and better footwork. Machado was rocked by several punches early in the fight and he was dropped in round 5. However, Machado came out strong in round 6 and had Corrales badly hurt. Corrales resorted to holding and tackled Machado, with both fighters hit the canvas. From that point, the defending champion was unable to use his better technique to his advantage, one of his gloves touched the canvas during round 7 but the referee failed to score it a knockdown. In round 8, Machado landed a hard left hook that dropped Corrales. Corrales was unable to recover before he was counted out, giving Machado the win and the title. Machado dedicated the victory to the victims of Hurricane Maria in Puerto Rico. As Machado was interviewed by Max Kellerman, Corrales tried to interrupt and demand a rematch but he was brushed off.

Corrales vs. Colbert 
On 18 January ,2020, Corrales fought Chris Colbert, who was ranked #3 by the WBA at super featherweight. Colbert beat Corrales by unanimous decision in their 12 round contest The scorecards were 116-111, 117-110, 117-110 in favor of Colbert.

Professional boxing record

References

External links
Jezreel Corrales - Profile, News Archive & Current Rankings at Box.Live

1991 births
Living people
World Boxing Association champions
Panamanian male boxers
Super-featherweight boxers
World super-featherweight boxing champions